Happy Valley, Ontario can refer to:

Happy Valley, King, Ontario
Happy Valley, Greater Sudbury, Ontario